John Gordon Cooper (April 27, 1872January 7, 1955) was an Anglo-American politician who served as a U.S. Representative from Ohio.

Early years
According to his birth certificate, Cooper was born in Smallthorne, Staffordshire, England. Cooper emigrated from England to the United States in 1881 with his mother, grandmother and brothers, as his father had emigrated in 1880. The family settled in Youngstown, Ohio, where he attended the public schools and began work in local steel mills in 1885.  He entered the service of the Pennsylvania Railroad Company in 1896, where he was employed as a locomotive fireman between 1896 and 1900, and as an engineer from 1900 and 1915.

Political career
Cooper served as member of the Republican county committee in 1906.  In 1910, he was a delegate to the Republican State convention, and he served as a member of the State house of representatives from 1910 to 1912.

Cooper was elected as a Republican to the Sixty-fourth and to the 10 succeeding Congresses between (March 4, 1915 and January 3, 1937).  He was an unsuccessful candidate for reelection in 1936 to the Seventy-fifth Congress, but went on to serve as chairman of the Board of Claims, Ohio Industrial Commission from 1937 to 1945.

Retirement
Cooper retired from public and political activities in 1947 and resided in Youngstown, Ohio. He died in Hagerstown, Maryland, January 7, 1955, and was interred in Lake Park Cemetery, in Youngstown, Ohio.

Sources

External links
 

1872 births
1955 deaths
People from Smallthorne
Politicians from Youngstown, Ohio
English emigrants to the United States
American railroaders
Republican Party members of the Ohio House of Representatives
British emigrants to the United States
Republican Party members of the United States House of Representatives from Ohio